Martin Rueda (born 9 January 1963) is a Swiss former professional footballer who played as a defender. His parents are Spanish, coming from Málaga. He was most recently the interim head coach of Neuchâtel Xamax in the Swiss Super League.

Rueda played for Grasshopper Club Zürich, FC Wettingen, FC Lucerne, Neuchâtel Xamax and was in the Swiss squad at the 1994 FIFA World Cup. He earned five caps in total.

He previously coached FC Wohlen, FC Winterthur, FC Aarau and Grasshopper Club Zürich U-16 and U-18.

References

1963 births
Living people
Swiss men's footballers
Swiss people of Spanish descent
1994 FIFA World Cup players
Switzerland international footballers
Grasshopper Club Zürich players
FC Wettingen players
FC Luzern players
Neuchâtel Xamax FCS players
Swiss Super League players
Swiss football managers
Swiss expatriate football managers
FC Aarau managers
FC Wohlen managers
FC Lausanne-Sport managers
BSC Young Boys managers
FC Winterthur managers
Footballers from Zürich
Association football defenders
Swiss Challenge League managers
Swiss Super League managers
Neuchâtel Xamax FCS managers
Expatriate football managers in the United Arab Emirates
Swiss expatriate sportspeople in the United Arab Emirates